The common name firecracker flower may refer to one of the following ornamental plants:

 Crossandra infundibuliformis, native to India and Sri Lanka
 Dichelostemma ida-maia, native to the United States

See also
 Firecracker plant (Russelia)